Phillip Shayon Riley (born September 24, 1972) is a former professional American football wide receiver, who played in one game for the New York Jets in 1996.

Running for Florida State, he was the 1995 NCAA Indoor Champion for 55 meter hurdles.

External links
Pro-Football-Reference

1972 births
Living people
Players of American football from Orlando, Florida
American football wide receivers
New York Jets players
Florida State Seminoles football players